Lawson is the first album by John Schumann and the Vagabond Crew. It was Schumann's first album of new material since 1993's True Believers.

It marked the first time that Schumann had worked on an album with Hugh McDonald and Michael Atkinson since Schumann left Redgum in 1985.

The album consists of the poetry of Henry Lawson put to music.

Album artwork
The cover art shows John Schumann and Henry Lawson, seemingly gazing at each other across the ages.

Track listing

"To An Old Mate" 
"Knocking Around"
"The Glass on the Bar"
"Second Class Wait Here"
"Faces In The Street"
"The Bush Girl"
"Taking His Chance"
"Scots of the Riverina"
"To Hannah"
"A Prouder Man Than You"
"The Low Lighthouse"
"The Shame of Going Back"
"To Jim"

Personnel
The Vagabond Crew
Michael Atkinson
Shannon Bourne 
Paul Cartwright
Michael Harris
Rob Hirst 
 Marcia Howard
 Shane Howard
Toby Lang
Mal Logan
Louise McCarthy
Hugh McDonald
Russell Morris 
Alan Pigram
Steven Pigram
Mike Rudd
Broderick Smith 
Chris Stockley
Mick Wordley

Demo musicians
Ian "Polly" Politis
Rohan Powell
Matt Schumann
Anthony Thyer

Additional musician (mentioned on individual song pages in the liner notes)
Kerryn Tolhurst

References

External links
 Redgum Lyrics Archive - Lawson

2005 albums
Covers albums
John Schumann albums